Shadows of Evil is an adventure for fantasy role-playing games published by Mayfair Games in 1984.

Contents
Shadows of Evil is composed of two scenarios for character levels 4–7, involving a cursed valley and evil "black" druids.  The book includes details on Celtic and druids culture as well as new spells and magic items.

Publication history
Shadows of Evil was written by Stephen R. Bourne with Bill Fawcett, with a cover by Boris Vallejo, and was published by Mayfair Games in 1984 as a 96-page book.

Reception

Reviews

References

Fantasy role-playing game adventures
Role Aids
Role-playing game supplements introduced in 1984